Phaulernis chasanica is a moth of the family Epermeniidae. It is found in the Russian Far East and Japan (Hokkaido, Honshu).

The length of the forewings is 5-5.7 mm. The forewings are whitish-grey, scattered with blackish-grey scales on the basal, costal apical and dorsal areas. The hindwings are pale grey.

References

Moths described in 1993
Epermeniidae
Moths of Japan
Moths of Asia